Edwar Osnel de la Cruz Colina (born May 3, 1997) is a Venezuelan professional baseball pitcher in the Texas Rangers organization. He previously played in Major League Baseball (MLB) for the Minnesota Twins.

Career

Minnesota Twins
Colina signed with the Minnesota Twins as an international free agent on September 29, 2015. He spent 2016–19 in the minor leagues for the club, playing for the DSL Twins, Elizabethton Twins, Cedar Rapids Kernels, Fort Myers Miracle, Pensacola Blue Wahoos, and Rochester Red Wings.

Colina had his contract selected to the 40-man and active rosters on September 25 and was called up to the majors for the first time. He made his debut that day for the Twins, but gave up three runs in 1/3 of an inning.

On April 7, 2021, Colina was placed on the 60-day injured list with inflammation in his right elbow.

Texas Rangers
On October 6, 2021, Colina was claimed off waivers by the Texas Rangers. On November 19, 2021, Colina was outrighted off the Rangers active roster.

References

External links

1997 births
Living people
Major League Baseball players from Venezuela
Venezuelan expatriate baseball players in the United States
Major League Baseball pitchers
Minnesota Twins players
Navegantes del Magallanes players
Dominican Summer League Twins players
Elizabethton Twins players
Cedar Rapids Kernels players
Fort Myers Miracle players
Pensacola Blue Wahoos players
Rochester Red Wings players